The Grenola Mill and Elevator is a grain elevator complex on Railroad Avenue in Grenola, Kansas. It was built in about 1909 and was listed on the National Register of Historic Places in 2002.

The complex includes a balloon-frame country grain elevator, a frame mixing room, a frame storage warehouse and scales. The complex had not been used for nearly 20 years when it was listed in 2002. The complex was known as the Grenola Elevator Museum at that time.

References

Agricultural buildings and structures on the National Register of Historic Places in Kansas
Commercial buildings completed in 1909
Grain elevators in the United States
Museums in Elk County, Kansas